During the earlier medieval period, a succession of mainly Turkic states ruled in the area of present-day Kazakhstan.

History of Kazakhstan